A list of places of worship in the Kerala municipality of Chengannur.

Hindu temples

 Chengannur Mahadeva Temple
 Cheriyanad Sree Balasubrahmanya Swami Temple
 Thrichittatt Maha Vishnu Temple
 Aranmula Parthasarathy Temple
 Puliyur Mahavishnu Temple
 Thiruvanvandoor Mahavishnu Temple
 Sree Narayanapuram Thrikkayil Temple, Perissery
 Anandeshwaram Mahadeva Temple, Pandanad

Christian Churches

 St. Mary's Orthodox Cathedral, Puthencavu
 Pazhaya Suriyani Pally (Old Syrian Church)
India Pentecostal Church of God, Chengannur town
Assemblies of God in India
St Mary's Knanaya Valiyapally Kallissery

Religious buildings and structures in Alappuzha district